Labedella phragmitis is a Gram-positive, rod-shaped, non-spore-forming, aerobic and non-motile bacterium from the genus Labedella which has been isolated from the surface of a plant from the Taklamakan Desert.

References

Microbacteriaceae
Bacteria described in 2020